Pieter Kuijpers (born 30 July 1968, Tegelen) is a Dutch film director, producer and screenwriter.

Films
Darkling (1995)
Godforsaken (Van God Los, 2003)
The Archives (De Ordening, 2003)(TV)
Off Screen (2005)
Gruesome School Trip (De Griezelbus, 2005)
Dennis P. (2007)
TBS (2008)
Love is the Word (2013)
Riphagen (2016)

TV series
12 steden, 13 ongelukken (1990)
Westenwind (1999)
Finals (2000)
Ares (2020)

Awards & Nominations
 2003 - Golden Calf Best Film & Best Screenplay, Nederlands Film Festival, for Van God Los
 2012 - Nomination Golden Calf Beste Director, Nederlands Film Festival, for Hemel op Aarde
 2013 - Nomination Magnolia Award, Shanghai International TV Festival, for Doodslag
 2016 -  ShortCutz Amsterdam Career Achievement Award

References

External links

1968 births
Living people
Dutch film directors
Dutch film producers
Golden Calf winners
People from Tegelen
Dutch screenwriters
Dutch male screenwriters
21st-century Dutch people